Yangmei Ancient Town is a traditional town located on the Yong River in Nanning, Guangxi, China. The town's population is approximately 5,300.

It contains a great deal of architecture from China's dynastic past (particularly the Ming Dynasty) and is a popular tourist destination. It is located about 30 km west of Nanning.

References

External links

Yangmei page

Nanning
Ancient Chinese cities
Villages in China